This is a list of Spanish flags, with illustrations.

National flags

Royal standards

Regional flags

Provincial flags

The provinces of La Corunna, Alicante, Castellón, Valencia and Zamora do not have a flag.

Islands

Balearic Islands

Canary Islands

Municipal flags

Historical flags

Kingdom of Asturias

Kingdom of Castile

Kingdom of León

Kingdom of Galicia

Granada

Kingdom of Toledo

Kingdom of Murcia

Kingdom of Navarre

Crown of Castile

Crown of Aragon

Flags
See also: Flag of Spain

Historical royal standards

See: Royal Standard of Spain

Royal banners of arms

Royal standards (common use)

Royal Guidons 

See: Guidon (heraldic flag)

Standards of heads of state

Members of the royal family

See also
Flags of the autonomous communities of Spain
Coats of arms of the autonomous communities of Spain
List of provincial flags of Spain
List of coats of arms of Spain

References

Sources 
The Flags of Spain. Flags of the World
 The history of the flag. Spanish Navy Web
The Spanish Royal Decree 1511/1977
 Royal and Governmental Standards of Spain (Images). Web of Luis Miguel Arias
https://www.youtube.com/watch?v=ueu5yohTBek

Spain
 
Flags
Spanish culture